Ival Eevazhi Ithu Vare is a 1980 Indian Malayalam film,  directed by K. G. Rajasekharan and produced by V. Gangadharan. The film stars Jayabharathi, Adoor Bhasi, Jose Prakash and Balan K. Nair in the lead roles. The film has musical score by Shankar–Ganesh.

Cast
Jayabharathi
Adoor Bhasi
Jose Prakash
Balan K. Nair
M. G. Soman

Soundtrack
The music was composed by Shankar–Ganesh and the lyrics were written by Mankombu Gopalakrishnan.

References

External links
 

1980 films
1980s Malayalam-language films
Films scored by Shankar–Ganesh
Films directed by K. G. Rajasekharan